Garland Turk Byrd (July 16, 1924 – June 1, 1997) was United States Democratic politician from Georgia, who served as the fourth Lieutenant Governor of Georgia from 1959 to 1963.

He was born in Reynolds in Taylor County in west central Georgia. Byrd graduated in 1941 from Reynolds High School. During World War II he served in the United States Army from October 1942 to October 1945 in engineer combat units. He fought in Normandy, Northern France, Germany and Austria. He was discharged at the rank of captain.

Byrd attended University of Georgia at Athens from 1946 to 1948, where he was a member of Sigma Chi, and earned LL.B. degree from Emory University School of Law in 1948.

A lifelong farmer and real estate businessman, he served as a member of the Georgia House of Representatives from 1947 to 1949 from Taylor County. He resigned from the legislature to become director and then assistant director of the state's Veterans Service Department from 1949 to 1952.

Elected Lieutenant Governor in 1958 he served this post from January 13, 1959 to January 15, 1963 under fellow Democrat, Governor Ernest S. Vandiver Jr.

After he left the lieutenant governor's position, Byrd was Democratic nominee for U.S. Representative from Georgia's 3rd congressional district in 1964. However, he lost to Republican nominee (and 1966 gubernatorial standard-bearer nominee) Howard Callaway. Byrd hence was the first Georgia Democrat to lose to a Republican congressional candidate since the Reconstruction era.

In 1966, Byrd ran as a segregationist in the Democratic primary for governor to succeed the term-limited Carl Sanders but finished in a distant fifth place. In the heated runoff election, Byrd endorsed former Governor Ellis Arnall, considered  the liberal candidate, who was defeated for the nomination by Lester Maddox of Atlanta, a segregationist who had closed his Pickrick Restaurant in 1964 to avoid serving African American customers. Maddox termed Byrd's support of Arnall "a sellout." The state legislature then elected Maddox over the Republican Howard Callaway when neither candidate obtained an outright majority of the vote in the general election, as was then required by the Georgia State Constitution.

Byrd was a Freemason. He was married to the former Gloria Elizabeth Whatley (born September 22, 1925). Byrd is interred at Hillcrest Cemetery in his native Reynolds, Georgia.

Electoral history

Georgia's 3rd congressional district, 1964 (Democratic primary)
Garland T. Byrd – 20,067 (34.38%)
Stephen Pace Jr. – 13,492 (23.11%)
Erle Cocke Jr. – 9,760 (16.72%)
Ed Wohlwender – 8,526 (14.61%)
Charles R. Adams – 4,242 (7.27%)
Robert Lee Newby – 2,287 (3.92%)

Georgia's 3rd congressional district, 1964 (Democratic primary runoff)
Garland T. Byrd – 22,584 (51.05%)
Stephen Pace Jr. – 21,653 (48.95%)

Georgia's 3rd congressional district, 1964
Howard Callaway (R) – 45,145 (57.23%)
Garland T. Byrd (D) – 33,733 (42.77%)

Democratic gubernatorial primary, 1966
 Former Governor Ellis Arnall – 231,480 (29.38%)
Lester Maddox – 185,672 (23.56%)
State Senator Jimmy Carter – 185,672 (23.56%)
James H. Gray – 164,562 (20.89%)
 Lieutenant Governor Garland T. Byrd – 39,994 (5.08%)
Hoke O'Kelley – 13,271 (1.68%)

References

External links
 Official detailed biography
 Political graveyard brief bio
 Ourcampaigns

1924 births
1997 deaths
People from Taylor County, Georgia
United States Army officers
United States Army personnel of World War II
University of Georgia alumni
Emory University School of Law alumni
Democratic Party members of the Georgia House of Representatives
Lieutenant Governors of Georgia (U.S. state)
Baptists from Georgia (U.S. state)
20th-century American politicians
20th-century Baptists
American Freemasons